Getå is a minor locality in Norrköping Municipality, Sweden.

History
On 1 October 1918 Getå was the site of the worst train accident in Swedish railroad history, killing at least 42 people. Many passengers were burned alive as unreinforced wooden cars burned, killing many who had survived the actual crash but were trapped in the wreckage.

References

Populated places in Östergötland County